COUP-TFII (COUP transcription factor 2), also known as NR2F2 (nuclear receptor subfamily 2, group F, member 2) is a protein that in humans is encoded by the NR2F2 gene. The COUP acronym stands for chicken ovalbumin upstream promoter.

Function 

COUP-TFII plays a critical role in controlling the development of a number of tissues and organs including heart, blood vessels, muscles and limbs.

The glucocorticoid receptor (GR) stimulates COUP-TFII-induced transactivation while COUP-TFII represses the GR transcriptional activity. COUP-TFII interacts with GATA2 to inhibit adipocyte differentiation.

Structure and ligands 
The structure of COUP-TF2 LBD is known. Retinoic acid, although not at physiological concentrations, activate this receptor.

Interactions 

COUP-TFII has been shown to interact with:
 HDAC1
 Lck
 V-erbA-related gene.
  Nucleolin

References

External links

Further reading 

 
 
 
 
 
 
 
 
 
 
 
 
 
 
 
 

Intracellular receptors
Transcription factors